Amington Hall is an early-19th-century former country house at Amington, near Tamworth, Staffordshire which has been converted into residential apartments.

History
The manor of Amington was anciently owned by the Clinton family.

The Repingtons replaced the ancient manor house early in the 18th century. This house, later a farmhouse, and now known as Amington Old Hall farmhouse, still stands and is a Grade II listed building.

The Repingtons prospered. In 1617 they acquired the neighbouring manor of Atherstone where they built a new Atherstone Hall.

At Amington they had a new house designed by Samuel Wyatt and built in about 1810 close to the old manor. It is a Grade II* listed building.  The two-storey building has an entrance front of three bays, the central bay pedimented and with a Tuscan porch. The unusual garden front has seven bays, of which the central three are bowed to full height and carry a domed roof. The brick rear service wing was added later in the 19th century.

The last of the Repingtons died in 1837 and the estate passed to a cousin Henry à Court. When Charles à Court Repington died in 1925 the estate passed to Sidney Fisher a local paper manufacturer. In 1963 the building was converted into apartments.

See also
Grade II* listed buildings in Tamworth (borough)
Listed buildings in Tamworth, Staffordshire

References

Grade II* listed buildings in Staffordshire
Buildings and structures in Tamworth, Staffordshire